Blastro Networks is a web-based company headquartered in Austin, TX, that runs three genre-specific, on-demand, streaming music video websites.

Blastro, voted “Best of the Web 2007”  by BusinessWeek, is an urban-centric site for Hip-Hop, R&B, Pop, Latin and Dance music enthusiasts. Roxwel is an alternative fusion of Rock, Metal and Indie entertainment, and Yallwire features Country, Bluegrass and Christian artists. They air mainstream and underground artist videos.

Founded in 1999, Blastro Networks remains independently owned and operated with major-label agreements that include Universal Music Group and Sony BMG.  The company has distribution partnerships with Windows Media Guide and Verizon FiOS TV.

References

External links
Blastro Networks
Blastro
Roxwel
Yallwire

Companies based in Austin, Texas
American music websites
Video on demand services